Wayne Enoka (born 30 January 1970) is a New Zealand former cricketer and coach. He played three first-class matches for Auckland in 1997/98. After his cricket career, Enoka has appeared on stage in productions of Avenue Q.

See also
 List of Auckland representative cricketers

References

External links
 

1970 births
Living people
New Zealand cricketers
Auckland cricketers
Cricketers from Auckland